AC Boulogne-Billancourt is an ice hockey team in Boulogne-Billancourt, France. ACBB currently plays in the FFHG Division 3, the fourth level of French ice hockey. They are a member of the Athletic Club de Boulogne-Billancourt association. The hockey section was created in 1952.

History
ACBB enjoyed success in the Ligue Magnus (then known as the 1re série) in the 1950s and 1960s, winning three league titles and finishing as runner-up seven times. They also won the Spengler Cup three years in a row from 1959 to 1961. The club forfeited the entire 1971-72 season after playing in only one game. ACBB has participated solely in the lower-level French leagues since then.

Achievements
Ligue Magnus
Champion (3) : 1957, 1960, 1962.
Runner-up (7) : 1958, 1959, 1961, 1963, 1964, 1965, 1966.
Spengler Cup
Champion (3) : 1959, 1960, 1961.

References

External links
Official site

Ice hockey teams in France